István Kiss may refer to:

 István Kiss (architect) (1857–1902), Hungarian architect
 István Kiss (decathlete) (born 1924), Hungarian decathlete; see 1946 European Athletics Championships – Men's decathlon
 István Kiss (footballer) (born 1970), Hungarian footballer
 István Kiss (gymnast) (born 1948), Hungarian Olympic gymnast
 István Kiss (long-distance runner) (born 1940), Hungarian long-distance runner; 1966 European Athletics Championships – Men's 5000 metres
 István Kiss (sculptor) (1927–1997), Hungarian sculptor
 István Kiss (water polo) (born 1958), Hungarian former water polo player

See also
 István Szegedi Kis (16th century), Calvinist theologian; see Ráckeve